Abney Crossroads is an unincorporated community and census-designated place (CDP) in Kershaw County, South Carolina, United States. It was first listed as a CDP prior to the 2020 census.

The CDP is in northern Kershaw County, along South Carolina Highway 341, which leads northwest  to Kershaw and southeast  to Bethune.

Demographics

References 

Census-designated places in Kershaw County, South Carolina
Census-designated places in South Carolina